The 2020–21 Maltese FA Trophy was the 83rd edition of the football cup competition. The cup began on 15 December 2020. The winners of the Maltese FA Trophy this season would have earned a place in the first qualifying round of the 2021–22 UEFA Europa Conference League.

There was no winner of the previous cup because the Malta FA Executive Committee cancelled the competition due to the COVID-19 pandemic in Malta.

On 9 April, the cup was abandoned due to the COVID-19 pandemic in Malta.

Preliminary round 
Twelve preliminary round matches were played on 15–27 December 2020. The draw for the preliminary round was held on 10 December 2020.

First round 
Sixteen first round matches were played on 2–24 February 2021. The draw for the first round was held on 14 January 2021.

Second round 
Eight second round matches were played on 2–4 March 2021. The draw for the second round was held on 18 February 2021.

See also 
 2020–21 Maltese Premier League

References

External links 
 Official FA Trophy website
 The Maltese FA Trophy on UEFA

Malta
2020-21
Cup
Maltese FA Trophy